The Audie Award for Fiction is one of the Audie Awards presented annually by the Audio Publishers Association (APA). It awards excellence in narration, production, and content for a fiction audiobook released in a given year, typically to the exclusion of speculative fiction. Before 2008 the award was given as the Audie Award for Unabridged Fiction. It has been awarded since 1996.

Winners and finalists

1990s

2000s

2010s

2020s

References

External links 

 Audie Award winners
 Audie Awards official website

Fiction
Awards established in 1996
English-language literary awards